Stephen Petranek is an American writer, and editor of Breakthrough Technology Alert. He has previously edited Discover, and The Washington Posts magazine. He was the founding editor and editor in chief of This Old House magazine for Time Inc., and was senior editor for science at Life magazine.

He is co-founder and President of Arc Programs. He also writes for the Daily Reckoning.

Petranek spoke at the TED conference in 2002, and again in 2016.

His book How We'll Live on Mars was published in 2015.

Education 
Petranek attended the University of Maryland College Park, receiving a BS, Business Administration. He served as editor-in-chief of the award-winning college newspaper, the Diamondback.

Works

References

External links 
 Bloomberg profile
 Articles by Petranek  in The Daily Reckoning
 
 
 How We'll Live on Mars by Stephen Petranek – digested read (The Guardian, 4 August 2015)

Year of birth missing (living people)
Living people
Place of birth missing (living people)
American non-fiction writers
Discover (magazine) people